This is an incomplete list of ghost towns in Minnesota, a northern state in the United States of America.

 Ashton
 Beaver
 Blue Eagle
 Belden, Minnesota
 Betcher, Minnesota
 Bodum
 Bruce
 Carnegie
 Cazenovia
 Chengwatana
 Childs
 Chippewa City, Minnesota
 Cisco
 Clayton
 Clear Grit, Minnesota
 Costin Village
 Cuba, Minnesota
 Dale
 Dickinson, Minnesota
 Dorothy
 Elcor
 Elliota, Minnesota
 Enterprise
 Fairland, Minnesota
 Fairpoint, Minnesota
 Fermoy
 Florence, Goodhue County, Minnesota
 Forestville (see also Forestville Mystery Cave State Park)
 Harlis, Minnesota
 Frankford, Minnesota Mower County
 Garen
 Grover
 Hamilton, Minnesota Fillmore County
 Homedahl
 Huot
 Imogene
 Lake Addie, Minnesota
 Leaf River
 Lewiston
 Lewisville 
 London
 Lude
 Mallard
 Manganese
 Muskoda
 New Prairie
 Nininger
 Oak Lake
 Old Crow Wing
 Old Wadena
 Parkton
 Pelan
 Philbrook
 Pinewood
 Pitt
Point Douglas
 Pomme de Terre
 Radium
 Rice Lake
 San Francisco
 Shell City
 Spina
 Splitrock
 Syre
 Terrebonne, Minnesota
 Topelius
 Vawter
 Vicksburg
 West Newton
 Whitewater Falls
 Winner
 Winnipeg Junction

Ghost towns
Minnesota